St Andrew's Hospital was a mental health facility in Thorpe St Andrew, Norwich, Norfolk, England. The main building survives and it is a Grade II listed building.

History
The hospital, which was designed by Francis Stone using an early corridor layout, opened as the Norfolk County Asylum in May 1814. Wings to the ward blocks, designed by John Brown, were added in 1849 and a large auxiliary building for chronic patients, designed by Robinson Cornish and Gaymer, was completed in 1881. The hospital was requisitioned for military use as the Norfolk War Hospital during the First World War and was then renamed the Norfolk County Mental Hospital in 1919.

The hospital joined the National Health Service as St Andrew's Hospital in 1948. After the introduction of Care in the Community in the early 1980s, the hospital went into a period of decline and closed in April 1998. The main buildings were subsequently converted into apartments as St Andrew's Park.

References

Hospitals in Norfolk
Defunct hospitals in England
Hospital buildings completed in 1814
Hospitals established in 1814
1814 establishments in England
1998 disestablishments in England
Hospitals disestablished in 1998
Former psychiatric hospitals in England